The 2010 season saw Somerset County Cricket Club competing in three domestic competitions; the first division of the County Championship, the Clydesdale Bank 40 and the Friends Provident t20.  They finished as runners-up in both the County Championship and the Friends Provident t20, and reached the final in the Clydesdale Bank 40 competition.

They were captained for the first season by former England international, Marcus Trescothick.

Background
The 2009 season saw Somerset play consistently well, but they fell short of winning in all four domestic competitions; prompting Director of Cricket Brian Rose to say "We've had enough of being cricket's nearly men."

Justin Langer, captain of the side from 2007 to 2009 retired from all forms of cricket at the end of the 2009 season, as did fast bowler Andrew Caddick.  Somerset signed Murali Kartik as their overseas player for 2010, although he would miss the first four weeks of the season they also added Damien Wright to play during this period.  In the Friends Provident t20, county sides are allowed to play two overseas players, and signed Kieron Pollard and Cameron White to fulfil these roles.  Nick Compton was signed from Middlesex as a batting replacement for Langer.

Squad
The following players made at least one appearance for Somerset in first-class, List A or Twenty20 cricket in 2010.  Age given is at the start of Somerset's first match of the season (15 April 2010).

County Championship

Season standings
Note: Pld = Played, W = Wins, L = Losses, D = Draws, T = Ties, A = Abandonments, Bat = Batting points, Bwl = Bowling points, Adj = Adjustments/Penalties, Pts = Points.

Match log

Batting averages

Bowling averages

Clydesdale Bank 40

Season standings

Match logs

Batting averages

Bowling averages

Friends Provident t20

Season standings
Note: Pld = Played, W = Wins, L = Losses, T = Ties, NR = No result, Pts = Points, NRR = Net run rate.

Match logs

Batting averages

Bowling averages

Tourist match

Match log

References

2010 in English cricket
Somerset County Cricket Club seasons